The CCHA Rookie of the Year is an annual award given out at the conclusion of the Central Collegiate Hockey Association regular season to the best freshman player in the conference as voted by the coaches of each CCHA team.

The Rookie of the Year award was first presented in 1978 and every year thereafter until 2013 when the original CCHA was dissolved as a consequence of the Big Ten Conference forming its men's ice hockey conference. The CCHA was reestablished in 2020, with play starting in the 2021–22 season, at which time the award was reinstated.

Award winners

Winners by school

Current teams

Former teams

Winners by position

See also
CCHA Awards

References

General

Specific

External links
CCHA Awards (Incomplete) 

College ice hockey trophies and awards in the United States